The 1993 Notre Dame Fighting Irish football team represented the University of Notre Dame in the 1993 college football season. The team was coached by Lou Holtz and played its home games at Notre Dame Stadium in South Bend, Indiana.

On November 13, Notre Dame played Florida State in a matchup of unbeatens, with the two ranked #1 and #2 in the AP Poll. The winner of this game, at Notre Dame Stadium in South Bend, Indiana, was certain to play #3 Nebraska (which would then move up to #2) in the Orange Bowl for the national championship.

The next week, they faced Boston College and although the Notre Dame offense piled up 427 yards of offense, scored 5 touchdowns, including 22 points in the last 11 minutes, the game would forever be remembered on Boston College's last drive as their kicker David Gordon hit a 41-yard field goal as time expired to win it 41–39, ending Notre Dame's bid for an undefeated season. Despite beating #7 Texas A&M in the Cotton Bowl on New Year's Day, the national championship was awarded to Florida State.

Rivalries
 In the Holy War match against Boston College, BC beat Notre Dame to claim the Frank Leahy Memorial Bowl.
 Notre Dame beat Michigan State to claim the Megaphone Trophy.
 Notre Dame beat Purdue to claim the Shillelagh Trophy.
 Notre Dame beat USC to claim the Jeweled Shillelagh.

Schedule

Roster

Rankings

Game summaries

Northwestern

Michigan

Michigan State

 Source:

Purdue

Stanford

Pittsburgh

BYU

USC

Navy

Florida State

The #2 Fighting Irish prevailed over the #1 Florida State Seminoles as ESPN's College GameDay made its first campus visit.

Boston College

Texas A&M

Awards and honors
 Aaron Taylor: Lombardi Award

Team players in the NFL

References

Notre Dame
Notre Dame Fighting Irish football seasons
Cotton Bowl Classic champion seasons
Notre Dame Fighting Irish football